A battalion is a military unit, typically consisting of 300 to 1,200 soldiers commanded by a lieutenant colonel, and subdivided into a number of companies (usually each commanded by a major or a captain). In some countries, battalions are exclusively infantry, while in others battalions are unit-level organizations.

The word battalion came into the English language in the 16th century from the French language (French: bataillon  meaning "battle squadron"; Italian: battaglione meaning the same thing; derived from the Vulgar Latin word battalia meaning "battle" and from the Latin word battuere meaning "to beat" or "to strike"). The first use of the word in English was in the 1580s.

Description
A battalion comprises two or more primary mission companies which are often of a common type (e.g., infantry, tank, or maintenance), although there are exceptions such as combined arms battalions in the U.S. Army. In addition to the primary mission companies, a battalion typically includes a headquarters staff and combat service support which may be combined into a headquarters and service company. A battalion may also contain a combat support company. With all these components, a battalion is the smallest military unit capable of "limited independent operations".

The battalion must have a source of re-supply to enable it to sustain operations for more than a few days. This is because a battalion's complement of ammunition, expendable weapons (e.g., hand grenades and disposable rocket launchers), water, rations, fuel, lubricants, replacement parts, batteries, and medical supplies normally consists of only what the battalion's soldiers and the battalion's vehicles can carry.

The commander's staff coordinates and plans operations. A battalion's subordinate companies and their platoons are dependent upon the battalion headquarters for command, control, communications, and intelligence, and the battalion's service and support structure. The battalion is usually part of a regiment, group, or brigade, depending on the branch of service.

NATO

NATO defines a battalion as "larger than a company, but smaller than a regiment" while "consisting of two or more company-, battery-, or troop-sized units and a headquarters." The standard NATO symbol for a battalion consists of a pair of vertical lines placed above a framed unit icon. Member nations have stipulated the different names they will use for organizations of this size.

British Army 

The term battalion is used in the British Army Infantry and some corps including the Royal Electrical and Mechanical Engineers, and Intelligence Corps. It was formerly used in the Royal Engineers (before they switched to regiments), and was also used in the now defunct Royal Army Ordnance Corps and Royal Pioneer Corps. Other corps usually use the term "regiment" instead.

An infantry battalion is numbered ordinarily within its regiment (e.g., 1st Battalion, The Rifles, usually referred to as 1 Rifles). It normally has a headquarters company, support company, and three rifle companies (usually, but not always, A, B and C companies). Each company is commanded by a major, the officer commanding (OC), with a captain or senior lieutenant as second-in-command (2IC). The HQ company contains signals, quartermaster, catering, intelligence, administration, pay, training, operations and medical elements. The support company usually contains anti-tank, machine gun, mortar, pioneer and reconnaissance platoons. Mechanised units usually have an attached light aid detachment (LAD) of the Royal Electrical and Mechanical Engineers (REME) to perform field repairs on vehicles and equipment. A British battalion in theatre during World War II had around 845 men; as of 2012, a British battalion had around 650 soldiers. With successive rounds of cutbacks after the war, many infantry regiments were reduced to a single battalion (others were amalgamated to form large regiments that maintained multiple battalions, e.g., the Royal Anglian Regiment).

Important figures in a battalion headquarters include:
 Commanding officer (CO) (invariably a lieutenant colonel)
 Second-in-command (2i/c) (major)
 Adjutant (captain)
 Quartermaster (QM) (LE captain)
 Quartermaster (technical) (QM(T))
 Medical officer (MO) (Royal Army Medical Corps captain or major)
 Administrative officer (Adjutant General's Corps captain or major)
 Padre (Royal Army Chaplains Department chaplain 4th or 3rd class)
 Operations officer (Ops) (lieutenant)
 Intelligence officer (IO) (lieutenant or captain)
 Regimental Signals officer (RSO) (Royal Corps of Signals captain)
 Regimental sergeant major (RSM) (warrant officer class 1)
 Regimental quartermaster sergeant (RQMS) (warrant officer class 2)
 Regimental quartermaster sergeant (technical) (RQMS(T)) (warrant officer class 2)
Battalions of other corps are given separate cardinal numbers within their corps (e.g., 101 Battalion REME).

Battle group 
A battle group consists of an infantry battalion or armoured regiment with sub-units detached from other military units acting under the command of the battalion commander.

Canadian Army 
In the Canadian Army, the battalion is the standard unit organization for infantry and combat service support and each battalion is divided into one or more sub-units referred to as companies.
In the Canadian Forces, most battalions are reserve units of between 100 and 200 soldiers that include an operationally ready, field-deployable component of approximately a half-company apiece. The nine regular force infantry battalions each contain three or four rifle companies and one or two support companies. Canadian battalions are generally commanded by lieutenant-colonels, though smaller reserve battalions may be commanded by majors.

Those regiments consisting of more than one battalion are:
 The Royal Canadian Regiment (three regular and one reserve battalions)
 Princess Patricia's Canadian Light Infantry (three regular battalions)
 Royal 22e Régiment (three regular and two reserve battalions)
 The Royal Newfoundland Regiment (two reserve battalions)
Tactically, the Canadian battalion forms the core of the infantry battle group, which also includes various supporting elements such as armour, artillery, combat engineers and combat service support. An infantry battle group will typically be commanded by the commander of the core infantry battalion around which it is formed and can range in size from 300 to 1,500 or more soldiers, depending on the nature of the mission assigned.

Indian Army 
A battalion in the Indian Army consists of four rifle companies. In turn each rifle company consists three platoons. A battalion in the Indian Army is commanded by a colonel. Normally a battalion is attached to a regiment of infantry, which is organized, as a general rule, of a number of battalions and the regimental centre battalion.

Royal Netherlands Army 
In the Royal Netherlands Army, a mechanised infantry battalion usually consists of one command- and medical company, three mechanised infantry companies, and one support company, which has three platoons with heavy mortars and three platoons with anti-tank missiles (TOW).

Combat companies consist of (usually mechanised) infantry, combat engineers, or tanks. There are also support battalions in the Dutch Army, which specialise on a specific task: for example, supplies and transport or communications.

The Netherlands have four battalions that are permanently reserved for the United Nations, for the purpose of peacekeeping duties.

An infantry battalion, logistical battalion, combat battalion, and the Netherlands Marine Corps all have a battalion structure. Each battalion usually consists of the following:
 Battalion command
 Commander
 Second in command
 General service
 Personnel section
 Intelligence section
 Operations section
 Materiel section
 Communication section
 Command company
 Command group
 Administration group
 Medical group
 Communication group
 Supply platoon
 Three infantry companies
 Support company
 Command group
 Recon platoon
 Mortar platoon
 Anti-tank platoon

Soviet Armed Forces

Motorised rifle battalion 

In the Soviet Armed Forces, a motorised rifle battalion could be mounted in either BTR armoured personnel carriers or BMP infantry fighting vehicles, with the former being more numerous into the late 1980s. Both consisted of a battalion headquarters of 12 personnel and three motorised rifle companies of 110 personnel each, along with a number of combat support units: a mortar battery consisting of eight 120mm 120-PM-43 mortars or automatic 82mm 2B9 Vasileks, an air defense platoon with nine MANPADs, either the SA-7 Grail, SA-14 Gremlin or SA-16 Gimlet, and an automatic grenade launcher platoon with six 30mm AGS-17 launchers. The BTR battalion also featured an anti-tank platoon with four AT-3 Sagger or AT-4 Spigot launchers and two 73mm SPG-9 recoilless guns; BTR units on high-readiness status sometimes had six missile launchers and three recoilless guns. Both featured the same support units as well, with a signal platoon, supply platoon, repair workshop and medical aid station. The addition of the antitank platoon meant that a BTR battalion at full strength was 525 personnel and 60 BTRs, including three command variants, while a BMP battalion consisted of 497 personnel and 45 BMPs, including three command variants.

Tank battalion 

Prior to the late 1980s, Soviet tank battalions consisted of three tank companies of 13 T-64, T-72 or T-80 tanks each, along with a battalion headquarters mounted in a command tank and a headquarters and service platoon, for a total of 165 personnel and 40 tanks; battalions using the older T-54, T-55 or T-62s tanks had 31 or 40 additional enlisted personnel. However, forces in Eastern Europe began to standardize to a smaller formation with 135 personnel and 31 tanks total, with each tank company consisting of 10 tanks total.

Artillery battalion 

A Soviet artillery battalion in the late 1980s consisted of a battalion headquarters, a headquarters platoon, a maintenance and supply platoon and three firing batteries, each with six artillery pieces, whether the self-propelled 2S1 Gvozdikas or the towed D-30 howitzers, and numbering 260 personnel or 240 personnel respectively. Rocket launcher artillery battalions consisted of a headquarters and headquarters platoon, a service battery and three firing batteries equipped with BM-21 Grads for a total of 255 personnel.

Swiss Army 
With the major reform of its armed forces in 2004, the Swiss Army abandoned the old regimental system and adopted a combat team approach centred on battalions as the building blocks of mission-oriented task forces. Battalion sizes vary between branches.

United States Armed Forces

United States Army 

In the United States Army, a battalion is a unit composed of a headquarters and two to six batteries, companies, or troops. They are normally identified by ordinal numbers (1st Battalion, 2nd Squadron, etc.) and normally have subordinate units that are identified by single letters (Battery A, Company A, Troop A, etc.). Battalions are tactical and administrative organizations with a limited capability to plan and conduct independent operations and are normally organic components of brigades, groups, or regiments.

A U.S. Army battalion includes the battalion commander (lieutenant colonel), executive officer (major), command sergeant major (CSM), headquarters staff, and usually three to five companies, with a total of 300 to 1,000 (but typically 500 to 600) soldiers. A regiment consists of between two and six organic battalions, while a brigade consists of between three and seven separate battalions.

During the American Civil War, an infantry or cavalry battalion was an ad hoc grouping of companies from the parent regiment (which had ten companies, A through K, minus J as described below), except for certain regular infantry regiments, which were formally organized into three battalions of six companies each (numbered 1–6 per battalion vice sequential letter designations). After 1882, cavalry battalions were renamed squadrons and cavalry companies were renamed troops. Artillery battalions typically comprised four or more batteries, although this number fluctuated considerably.

During World War II, most infantry regiments consisted of three battalions (1st, 2nd, and 3rd) with each battalion consisting of three rifle companies and a heavy weapons company. That is, rifle companies A, B, C along with heavy weapons Company D were part of the 1st battalion, rifle companies E, F, G, and heavy weapons Company H constituted the 2nd battalion, and rifle companies I, K, L, and heavy weapons Company M were in the 3rd. There was no J Company: the letter J was traditionally not used because in 18th- and 19th-century old-style type, the capital letters I and J looked alike, and were therefore easily confused with one another. It was common for a battalion to become temporarily attached to a different regiment. For example, during the confusion and high casualty rates of both the Normandy Landings and the Battle of the Bulge, in order to bolster the strength of a depleted infantry regiment, companies and even battalions were moved around as necessary.

The U.S. Army also created independent tank battalions to attach to infantry divisions during World War II in order to give them fire support.

From the 1960s through the early 1980s, a typical maneuver (infantry or tank) battalion had five companies: headquarters and headquarters company (HHC) and A, B, and C Companies, plus a combat support company (CSC), with a scout platoon, 107 mm (4.2 inch) heavy mortar platoon, along with other elements that varied between organizations. These included heavy anti-tank TOW missile platoons, ground surveillance radar sections and man-portable air-defense system sections. Beginning in the early 1980s, some elements of the combat support companies (the mortar and scout platoons) were merged into the headquarters company with the staff and support elements, others were moved to their parent type organization (ground surveillance radar and air defense), and in infantry battalions the heavy anti-tank missile platoon was organized as a separate company (E Company). In the late 1980s, there was a fourth "line" company added (D Company) in most infantry and tank battalions.

In this older structure, U.S. Army mechanized infantry battalions and tank battalions, for tactical purposes, task-organized companies to each other, forming a battalion-sized task force (TF).

Starting in 2005–2006, the U.S. Army's mechanized and tank battalions were reorganized into combined arms battalions (CABs). Tank battalions and mechanized infantry battalions no longer exist. These new combined arms battalions are modular units, each consisting of a headquarters company, two mechanized infantry companies, two tank companies, and a forward support company attached from the battalion's parent brigade support battalion. This new structure eliminated the need to task-organize companies between battalions; each combined arms battalion was organically composed of the requisite companies. At a higher level, each armored brigade (formerly designated 'heavy brigade') is now composed of three CABs (versus the two CABs of a former heavy brigade), one reconnaissance squadron, one artillery battalion, one brigade engineer battalion (BEB), and one brigade support battalion (BSB).

United States Marine Corps 

A United States Marine Corps battalion includes the battalion headquarters, consisting of the commanding officer (usually a lieutenant colonel, sometimes a colonel), an executive officer (the second-in-command, usually a major), the sergeant major, and the executive staff (S-1 through S-4 and S-6). The battalion headquarters is supported by a headquarters and service company (battery). A battalion usually contains two to five organic companies (batteries in the artillery), with a total of 500 to 1,200 Marines in the battalion. A regiment consists of a regimental headquarters, a headquarters company (or battery), and two to five organic battalions (Marine infantry regiments – three battalions of infantry; Marine artillery regiments – three to five battalions of artillery; Marine combat logistics regiments – one to three combat logistics battalions). In the U.S. Marine Corps, the brigade designation is used only in "Marine Expeditionary Brigade" (MEB). An MEB is one of the standard Marine Air-Ground Task Forces (MAGTF), is commanded by a brigadier general or major general, and consists of command element, a ground combat element (usually one reinforced Marine infantry regiment), an aviation combat element (a reinforced Marine aircraft group including rotary wing, fixed wing, and tiltrotor aircraft), and a combat logistics element (a Marine combat logistics regiment, which includes naval construction forces [Seabees] and naval medical elements).

In the U.S. Marine Corps, an infantry or "rifle" battalion typically consists of a headquarters and service company, three rifle, or "line", companies (designated alphabetically A through M depending upon which battalion of the parent regiment to which they are attached) and a weapons company. Weapons companies do not receive a letter designation. Marine infantry regiments use battalion and company designations as described above under World War II, with company letters D, H, and M not normally used but rather held in reserve for use in augmenting a fourth rifle company into each battalion as needed.

United States Marine Corps infantry battalions are task organized into Battalion Landing Teams (BLTs) as the ground combat element (GCE) of a Marine Expeditionary Unit (MEU). A standard U.S. Marine infantry battalion is typically supported by an artillery battery and a platoon each of tanks, amphibious assault vehicles, light armored reconnaissance vehicles, reconnaissance Marines, and combat engineers. The battalion structure is designed to readily expand to include a fourth rifle company, if required, as described above under battalion organization. Often Air Naval Gunfire Liaison Company (ANGLICO) officers are assigned to the battalion, to coordinate naval gunfire support.

United States Navy 
The United States Navy has construction battalions and navy cargo handling battalions. They are structured roughly analogous to an Army or Marine Corps battalion with staff and commanding officers of similar grade and experience.

See also 

 Battalion (Sweden)
 Indonesian Army infantry battalions
 March battalion
 Military organization

References

External links 
 French Infantry of the Napoleonic Wars
 The Battalion Commander's Handbook, 1996, by Major General Richard A. Chilcoat, US Army War College, Carlisle Barracks, Pennsylvania

Military units and formations by size